Malcolm Sim Longair  (born 18 May 1941) is a British physicist. From 1991 to 2008 he was the Jacksonian Professor of Natural Philosophy in the Cavendish Laboratory at the University of Cambridge. Since 2016 he has been Editor-in-Chief of the Biographical Memoirs of Fellows of the Royal Society.

Education
He was born on 18 May 1941, and educated at Morgan Academy, Dundee, Scotland. He graduated in Electronic Physics from Queen's College, Dundee, which later became the University of Dundee, but was then part of the University of St Andrews, in 1963.  He became a research student in the Radio Astronomy Group of the Cavendish Laboratory, Cambridge, where he completed his PhD in 1967 supervised by Martin Ryle.

Career and research
From 1968 to 1969, he was a Royal Society Exchange Visitor to the Lebedev Institute of the USSR Academy of Sciences, where he worked with Vitaly Ginzburg and Yakov Zeldovich.

He held a Fellowship of the Royal Commission for the Exhibition of 1851 from 1966 to 1968 and was a Fellow of Clare Hall, Cambridge from 1967 to 1980.  He has held visiting professorships at the California Institute of Technology (1972), the Institute for Advanced Study in Princeton (1978), the Center for Astrophysics  Harvard & Smithsonian (1990) and the Space Telescope Science Institute (1997).  From 1980 to 1990, he held the joint posts of Astronomer Royal for Scotland, Regius Professor of Astronomy of the University of Edinburgh and Director of the Royal Observatory, Edinburgh. He is a Professorial Fellow and Vice-President of Clare Hall, Cambridge.  He was Deputy Head of the Cavendish Laboratory with special responsibility for the teaching of physics from 1991 to 1997, and Head of the Cavendish Laboratory from 1997 to 2005.

Longair's primary research interests are in the fields of high-energy astrophysics and astrophysical cosmology.  He has written eight books and many articles on this work.  His most recent publication is the second edition of his Theoretical Concepts in Physics, released in December 2003.  His other interests include music, mountain walking (completing the Munros in 2011), art, architecture and golf.  he is the editor-in-chief of the Biographical Memoirs of Fellows of the Royal Society and has authored or co-authored biographies of John E. Baldwin, Vitaly Ginzburg, Brian Pippard, Geoffrey Burbidge and David J. C. MacKay.

Selected publications
Books
 2nd: pbk, 1992, 440pp., 

 revised and enlarged 2nd edition: 2003, 588pp., 

Papers

 he had published 298 papers.

During his career he supervised numerous PhD students including Jim Dunlop, Stephen Gull, Simon Lilly and John Peacock.

Awards and honours
Longair has received numerous awards, including:

1986 - the first Britannica Award for the Dissemination of Learning and the Enrichment of Life
1990 - In December 1990, he delivered the series of Royal Institution Christmas Lectures for Young People on television on the topic 'The Origins of Our Universe'.
1991 - From 1991 to 1992 he was President of the Physics Section of the British Association for the Advancement of Science.  
1994 - Awarded the 1994 Science Prize of the Saltire Society-Royal Bank of Scotland Annual award.
1994 - Chairman of the Gemini Board, the international project to build 8-metre telescopes in the northern and southern hemispheres, for the years 1994 and 1995.
1995 - In 1995, he was Selby Fellow of the Australian Academy of Science and took a lecture demonstration entitled 'Measuring the Fundamentals' around all the state capitals of Australia.
1995 - Chairman of the Space Telescope Science Institute Council for 1995–6.  
1996 - President of the Royal Astronomical Society 1996–8.  
2000 - Appointed CBE in the 2000 New Year Honours List. 
2004 - Elected a Fellow of the Royal Society (FRS).

References

External links 
 
 
 
 
 

1941 births
Living people
Scottish astronomers
Fellows of the Royal Society
Fellows of the Royal Society of Edinburgh
Harvard University staff
Academics of the University of Edinburgh
Commanders of the Order of the British Empire
Fellows of Clare Hall, Cambridge
Jacksonian Professors of Natural Philosophy
Alumni of the University of Cambridge
Alumni of the University of St Andrews
Scottish physicists
Presidents of the Royal Astronomical Society
Scientists from Dundee
People educated at Morgan Academy
Alumni of the University of Dundee
Scientists of the Cavendish Laboratory